The 2007 Major League Baseball First-Year Player Draft was Major League Baseball's annual amateur draft of high school and college baseball players and was held on June 7, 2007 and June 8, 2007. The first day session of the draft included the first 25 rounds and was scheduled to be broadcast "live" from Orlando, Florida on television for the first time, on ESPN2 from 2:00pm to 6:00pm Eastern Daylight Time (1800–2200 UTC). Previously the conference call format draft was broadcast live, along with commentary, on both draft days exclusively from the MLB.com website as streaming audio. In total, the draft featured 50 rounds and 1453 selections.

First Round Selections

Supplemental First Round selections

Compensation Picks

Other notable players

 Jordan Zimmermann, 2nd round, 67th overall by the Washington Nationals
 Giancarlo Stanton, 2nd round, 76th overall by the Florida Marlins
 Freddie Freeman, 2nd round, 78th overall by the Atlanta Braves
 Zack Cozart, 2nd round, 79th overall by the Cincinnati Reds
 Austin Romine, 2nd round, 94th overall by the New York Yankees
 Danny Duffy, 3rd round, 96th overall by the Kansas City Royals
 Jonathan Lucroy, 3rd round, 101st overall by the Milwaukee Brewers
 Daniel Descalso, 3rd round, 112th overall by the St. Louis Cardinals
 Matt Harvey, 3rd round, 118th overall by the Los Angeles Angels of Anaheim, but did not sign
 Darwin Barney, 4th round, 127th overall by the Chicago Cubs
 Corey Kluber, 4th round, 134th overall by the San Diego Padres
 Charlie Furbush, 4th round, 151st overall by the Detroit Tigers
 Jake Arrieta, 5th round, 159th overall by the Baltimore Orioles
 Steve Cishek, 5th round, 166th overall by the Florida Marlins
 Will Middlebrooks, 5th round, 174th overall by the Boston Red Sox
 Marc Rzepczynski, 5th round, 175th overall by the Toronto Blue Jays
 Andrew Romine, 5th round, 178th overall by the Los Angeles Angels of Anaheim
 Nate Jones, 5th round, 179th overall by the Chicago White Sox
 Anthony Rizzo, 6th round, 204th overall by the Boston Red Sox
 Ryan Brasier, 6th round, 208th overall by the Los Angeles Angels of Anaheim
 Lucas Duda, 7th round, 243rd overall by the New York Mets
 Matt Moore, 8th round, 245th overall by the Tampa Bay Devil Rays
 Marcus Walden, 9th round, 295th overall by the Toronto Blue Jays
 Greg Holland, 10th round, 306th overall by the Kansas City Royals
 David Lough, 11th round, 336th overall by the Kansas City Royals
 Brandon Belt, 11th round, 348th overall by the Atlanta Braves, but did not sign
 Ryan Pressly, 11th round, 354th overall by the Boston Red Sox
 Stephen Vogt, 12th round, 365th overall by the Tampa Bay Devil Rays
 Manny Barreda, 12th round, 394th overall by the New York Yankees
 Shawn Kelley, 13th round, 405th overall by the Seattle Mariners
 James Russell, 14th round, 427th overall by the Chicago Cubs
 Josh Collmenter, 15th round, 463rd overall by the Arizona Diamondbacks
 Brian Schlitter, 16th round, 503rd overall by the Philadelphia Phillies
 Mitch Moreland, 17th round, 530th overall by the Texas Rangers
 Matt Reynolds, 20th round, 612th overall by the Colorado Rockies
 Chris Sale, 21st round, 642nd overall by the Colorado Rockies, but did not sign
 Dillon Gee, 21st round, 663rd overall by the New York Mets
 Yasmani Grandal, 27th round, 834th overall by the Boston Red Sox, but did not sign
 Seth Rosin, 28th round, 872nd overall by the Minnesota Twins, but did not sign
 Andrew Cashner, 29th round, 877th overall by the Chicago Cubs, but did not sign
 Dylan Axelrod, 30th round, 927th overall by the San Diego Padres
 Craig Kimbrel, 33rd round, 1,006th overall pick by the Atlanta Braves, but did not sign
 Drew Storen, 34th round, 1,050th overall by the New York Yankees, but did not sign

NFL players drafted
 Dennis Dixon, 5th round, 168th overall by the Atlanta Braves
 Pat White, 27th round, 838th overall by the Los Angeles Angels of Anaheim, but did not sign
 Russell Wilson, 41st round, 1,222nd overall by the Baltimore Orioles, but did not sign
 Golden Tate, 42nd round, 1,252nd overall by the Arizona Diamondbacks, but did not sign

Background
Ross Detwiler was the first 2007 draftee to play in the major leagues.

David Price became the first player from the 2007 draft to be the starting pitcher of an All-Star Game in 2010. He was also the first pitcher to pitch in the Post-Season and World Series pitching in relief for the 2008 Tampa Bay Rays in the 2008 World Series. He was also the first player in this draft to win a Cy Young Award (which he won in 2012).

Jason Heyward became the first position player from the 2007 draft to be a starter of an All-Star Game in 2010.

Rick Porcello was the first player from the 2007 draft to be named as a starter at the outset of the season from Spring training. He initially started the 2009 season in the 5th rotation spot for the Detroit Tigers but by mid-season was promoted to the 3rd starter.

Madison Bumgarner was the first 2007 draftee to win the World Series and did so in the World Series with the San Francisco Giants in 2010. He also was the first player to win the World Series MVP award (which he won in 2014).

References

External links
 MLB official website 
 2007 draft page MLB.com
 2007 Complete Draft Order MLB.com
 2007 Draft Tracker MLB.com
 2007 "Top Ten" MLB draft predictions per Jonathan Mayo  at MLB.com (16 May 2007)
 2007 "Top Twenty" MLB draft predictions per Jonathan Mayo  at MLB.com (23 May 2007)
 2007 Top 30 Projected Picks per Jonathan Mayo  at MLB.com (7 June 2007)
 Last Minute Shifts in "Top 30" per Jonathan Mayo  (7 June 2007)
 Draft rules MLB.com
 Draft history MLB.com
 Complete draft list from The Baseball Cube database

Major League Baseball draft
Draft
Major League Baseball draft
Major League Baseball draft
Baseball in Florida
Events in Orlando, Florida
Sports in Orlando, Florida
2000s in Orlando, Florida